James J. Plaster (September 23, 1926 – December 12, 2012) was an American politician. He served as a member for the 82nd district of the Alabama House of Representatives.

Life and career 
Plaster was born in Autaugaville. He attended Hicks Memorial High School and served in the United States Navy during World War II. After his service, he attended Auburn University.

In 1974, Plaster was elected to represent the 82nd district of the Alabama House of Representatives, serving until 1978.

Plaster died in December 2012, at the age of 86.

References 

1926 births
2012 deaths
Members of the Alabama House of Representatives
Alabama Democrats
20th-century American politicians
Auburn University alumni